San Yati Moe Myint (born Thal Thal Aung Myint on 3 June 1994) is a Burmese actress and model. She is considered one of the most successful actresses in Burmese cinema and one of the highest-paid actresses. Throughout her career, she has acted in over 200 films.

Early life and education
San Yati Moe Myint was born on 3 June 1994 in Yangon, Myanmar to parent Aung Myint aka Mazda Aung Myint, a photographer and his wife Khin Moe Thu. She is the second child among four siblings. From 1st till 8th grade, she attended Basic Education Middle School No. 1 Dagon, moving to Basic Education High School No. 2 Dagon for her 9th and 10th. She studied in the English majoring at the Dagon University for 2nd years.

Career
She often getting familiar and adoring all of the actors, actresses, models and all that came to her father's photo studio. She claimed that it was then that her passion for acting begin, dancing and singing along to numerous TV advertisements that were common during her childhood years. Because of the passion, she joined John Lwin's model training tangency Stars & Models International in 2010. Since then, she took professional training in modelling and catwalk. She began her entertainment career as a photo model. She first appeared on cover of the Idea Magazine. Then, she appeared on many local magazine cover photos. Then came the offers for TV commercials. She has appeared countless more commercial advertisements. Her hardwork as a model and acting in commercials was noticed by the film industry and soon, movie casting offers came rolling in.

She made her acting debut in 2012 with a leading role in the film Thain Mwe Thaw Lamin Nat Shine Thaw Pinle (The Gentle Moon, The Deep Sea) alonsige Aung Ye Lin. In 2014, she made her big screen debut in film Professor Dr. Sate Phwar, where she played the main role with Kyaw Thu, Yan Aung, Ye Aung and May Myat Noe, which screened in Myanmar cinemas on 24 June 2016. Ever since then she had starred in over 200 films and countless more advertisements, music videos and so on.

Filmography

Film (Cinema)
 Professor Dr. Sate Phwar (2016)
 Thone Yout Paung Laung Kyaw (2019)
Ko Paw (2020)

Film

References

External links

San Yati Moe Myint on iflix

1994 births
Living people
Burmese film actresses
Burmese female models
21st-century Burmese actresses
People from Yangon